The Environmentally Sensitive Areas Scheme was an agri-environment scheme run by the UK Government within the 22 designated Environmentally Sensitive Areas.

The scheme was superseded in 2005 by the Environmental Stewardship schemes.

United Kingdom environmental management schemes